Saiyinjiya (born October 25, 1976, in Xilin Gol League, Inner Mongolia) is a male Southern Mongol freestyle wrestler from PRC who competed at the 2004 Summer Olympics.

He finished eleventh in the 74 kg Greco-Roman competition.

External links
profile

1976 births
Living people
Chinese male sport wrestlers
Olympic wrestlers of China
People from Xilingol League
Wrestlers at the 2004 Summer Olympics
Sportspeople from Inner Mongolia
Wrestlers at the 2002 Asian Games
Asian Games competitors for China
21st-century Chinese people